Beyza Irem Türkoglu (born 4 February 1997) is a Turkish handball player who plays as centre back for Danish club Team Esbjerg in the Bambusa Kvindeligaen. She has previously played for Yenimahalle Bld. SK and lately Kastamonu Bld. GSK in the Turkish Super League.

On 27 May 2021, it was announced that she had signed a 1-year contract with Team Esbjerg, from Kastamonu Bld. GSK.

Achievements
Turkish Super League:
Winner: 2015, 2016
Silver Medalist: 2014

References

1997 births
Living people
Turkish female handball players
People from Altındağ, Ankara
Mediterranean Games competitors for Turkey
Competitors at the 2022 Mediterranean Games
20th-century Turkish sportswomen
21st-century Turkish sportswomen